The Almond Valley Light Railway is a  narrow gauge heritage railway running at the Almond Valley Heritage Trust site at Livingston, Scotland. The railway operates at weekends between Easter and the end of September and daily during some school holiday periods. There are two stations, both with waiting shelters and run round loops. A small two-road loco shed is provided at the heritage centre end of the line. There is a storage siding here also.

Locomotives 
The line uses only internal combustion locomotives. It has never intended to use steam locomotives and therefore has no facilities for them. The railway is home to a number of electric locomotives (five battery, one overhead); however, these are not used. All of the battery locomotives are likely to require new batteries before being used again.

See also 
British narrow gauge railways

References

External links 
Almond Valley Heritage Centre website
Almond Valley Light Railway website

2 ft 6 in gauge railways in Scotland
Heritage railways in Scotland